And Then There Were None is a 1939 novel by Agatha Christie, originally titled Ten Little Niggers and later also published as Ten Little Indians.

And Then There Were None may also refer to:

Adaptations of Christie's novel 
 And Then There Were None (play), a 1943 play by Agatha Christie
 And Then There Were None (1945 film), a film by René Clair
 Ten Little Indians (1965 film), a film by George Pollock
 And Then There Were None (1974 film), a film by Peter Collinson
 And Then There Were None (1987 film), a Soviet film by Stanislav Govorukhin
 Ten Little Indians (1989 film) or And Then There Were None, a film by Harry Alan Towers
 Agatha Christie: And Then There Were None a 2005 computer game
 And Then There Were None (TV series), a 2015 television series
 And Then There Were None, a 1944 Dundee Repertory Theatre Company adaptation that restores the original ending of the novel
 And Then There Were None, a 2005 play by Kevin Elyot and directed by Steven Pimlott

Music
 And Then There Were None (band), an American rock band
 "And Then There Were None", a song by Exodus from Bonded by Blood
 "And Then There Were None", a song from the musical Spring Awakening
 And Then There Were None..., a 2016 album by Church Of Misery

Other uses
"And Then There Were None" (CSI), an episode of CSI: Crime Scene Investigation
"...And Then There Were None" (Supernatural), an episode of Supernatural
"And Then There Were None", an episode of Gilligan's Island (season 3)
...And Then There Were None, a 1951 science-fiction novella by Eric Frank Russell, adapted for his 1962 novel The Great Explosion
And Then There Were None, an anti-abortion organisation for ex-clinic workers managed by Abby Johnson
"and then there were none", a phrase from the 1868 children's rhyme "Ten Little Injuns"
"And Then There Were None", a short story by Eric Frank Russell

See also

 
 
 Ten Little Indians (disambiguation)
 Ten Little Niggers (disambiguation)